The 2011–12 Isle of Man League is the 103rd season of the Isle of Man Football League on the Isle of Man.

League tables

Premier League

Division 2

Cups

FA Cup

St Georges   7–3    Union Mills

Railway Cup
St Georges   1–0    St Marys

Charity Shield
St Georges   8–1    Rushen United

Hospital Cup
St Georges   3–2    Peel

Woods Cup
Union Mills   3–1    Douglas Royal

References
FA Full Time – IOM Football League 2011–12

Isle of Man Football League seasons
Man
Foot
Foot